The Hotel is a Singapore Chinese drama which was telecast on Singapore's television station, Mediacorp, in 2001. It was released in December 2001 and was slated to be the blockbuster for the year 2001. The series has been rerun on MediaCorp Channel 8 and also on AZN Television. It stars Edmund Chen , Ivy Lee , Chen Hanwei , Jacelyn Tay , Chen Liping , May Phua & Yang Libing as the casts of this series.

This series is unique as it has a large ensemble guest cast featuring over 95% of MediaCorp Channel 8 artistes appearing as hotel guests, including Zoe Tay, Gurmit Singh (Phua Chu Kang), Xiang Yun and many others. Most artistes' character names were similar to their own and, unusual for a drama series, their names were introduced on screen, not only in the credits at the end.

Synopsis
The Hotel revolves around a family-run business named Queen's Hotel which has been around for 2 decades. It is Christmas time and the staff are busy running the hotel and preparing for guests. Jointly run by Seto (Ivy Lee), her sister, Rainbow (Jacelyn Tay), brother, Ah Boy (Andi Lim) and sister-in-law Lychee (Yang Libing), their 3-star hotel goes downhill due to poor management. Alarmed at the poor financial situation, sleeping major shareholders and Emil (Edmund Chen) and his younger brother Sunny (Chen Hanwei) step in to salvage the failing business. Emil introduces a series of budget cuts, which results in friction between the brothers and Seto's family. He strives to instill professionalism and a customer-oriented attitude into his staff, but his straight-talking demeanour makes him much hated, especially by Seto.

Very different in character, Seto and Emil do not see eye to eye with each other on many issues. Emil however admires Rainbow's frankness and decides to court her. Seto, who deems men as good-for-nothings, is unexpectedly drawn to Sunny's manliness. Sunny and Rainbow are dreadfully worried about the affections of each other's elder siblings; they pose as lovers in order to fend them off. However, the two of them fall genuinely in love instead, leaving Seto and Emil devastated.

As fate would have it, a series of events in the hotel dissolves the animosity between Seto and Emil and they soon develop feelings for each other. However, pride prevents them from admitting their feelings.

Under Emil's management, the hotel business sees some improvement. A businessman offers to take over the hotel but is rejected by Emil as his beloved has a stake in it as well. Just as he finally decides to express his love for Seto openly, the hotel is served with a lawsuit by a mysterious lawyer who turns out to have a long-buried grudge against Emil and Sunny.

Cast

Main cast

Star appearances

External links

The Hotel on Mediacorp website
Theme Song on YouTube

Singapore Chinese dramas